David J. Cooper is a Professor of Accounting at the University of Alberta, Canada.  He is the co-founder, along with Anthony Tinker, of the academic journal Critical Perspectives on Accounting and is also a long-time associate editor of Accounting, Organizations and Society.  He is best known as a central figure and co-founder of the critical accounting and public interest accounting movements: movements which emphasize the importance of not only studying the roles of accounting in organizations and society but also using this knowledge to intervene in the public sphere.

Life and career 
Cooper was born in London, England. He completed his undergraduate studies at the London School of Economics in 1970 and his PhD at the University of Manchester in 1980. In the early 1990s, he moved from the United Kingdom to Canada, eventually accepting a research chair at the University of Alberta.  He has continued to lecture widely and has held visiting positions at Oxford University, the London School of Economics and the University of Edinburgh.

Intellectual contributions 
Cooper has pushed our understanding of three aspects of accounting practice.  First, his research on the political economy of accounting during the 1980s, helped to incite a vibrant research tradition on the role of accounting numbers in social struggle.  Political economy of accounting approaches acknowledge that accounting numbers both selectively re-present social reality and act as a distributional mechanism for allocating societal resources.  These insights have been taken up and used to study a variety of public interest accounting topics such as environmental reporting as well as class and gender-based aspects of financial reporting.

Second, Cooper’s research on the accounting profession has illuminated the intersections among public accounting firm practices, the organization of the accounting profession, and the associated societal-level consequences.  This stream of research draws upon the sociology of the professions literature, extending this literature to show how the accounting profession is similar yet different from other professions such as medicine and law.  The research also traces how globalization has impacted on the organization and activities of public accounting.

Third, Cooper has theorized and practiced the role of the specific, public intellectual.  Building on the insights of Foucault and Bourdieu, Cooper showed the importance of using accounting expertise to intervene in the public sphere.  The interventions included the United Kingdom Coal Board interventions in the 1980s as well as the debt/deficit interventions and privatization interventions in Canada in the 1990s.

More recently, Cooper has served as a board member and resident accounting expert for the Parkland Institute, a Canadian-based public think-tank.

Intellectual lineage 
Cooper has supervised and/or acted as mentor to a group of prominent accounting academics.  These include Keith Robson (editor-in-chief of Accounting, Organizations and Society), Vaughan Radcliffe (who has studied public secrets within governmental accounting), Dean Neu (another public interest accounting researcher), and Daniel Martinez (who studies NGO accountability).

References

Academic staff of the University of Alberta
English expatriates in Canada
Living people
Alumni of the University of Manchester
Accounting academics
Year of birth missing (living people)